Saint Caspar (otherwise known as Casper, Gaspar, Kaspar, Jasper, and other variations) was one of the 'Three Kings', along with Melchior and Balthazar, representing the wise men or Biblical Magi mentioned in the Bible in the Gospel of Matthew, verses 2:1-9. Although the Bible does not specify who or what the Magi were, since the seventh century, the Magi have been identified in Western Christianity as Caspar, Melchior and Balthasar. Caspar and the other two are considered saints by the Catholic Church.

Name origin 

While it is generally accepted that Casper/Gaspar/Jasper was one of the Biblical Magi or 'three wise men' who were said to have visited the infant Jesus - bearing gifts of gold, frankincense and myrrh - there is some debate in academic literature over the rendering of his name. It is likely that these varied renderings are driven by regional and linguistic differences among scholars in different times, places and tongues.  

Jasper is traditionally identified as having brought the gold, hence the Persian etymology of Jasper as a given name, meaning 'bringer of gifts' or 'treasurer'.

The name Caspar or Casper is derived from "Gaspar" which in turn is from an ancient Chaldean word, "Gizbar", which according to  Strong's Concordance means "treasurer". The form "Gizbar" appears in the Hebrew version of the Old Testament Book of Ezra (1:8). In fact, the modern Hebrew word for "treasurer" is still "Gizbar". By the 1st century B.C. the Septuagint gave a Greek translation of "Gizbar" in Ezra 1:8 as "γασβαρηνου" ("Gasbarinou", literally son of "Gasbar").  The transition from "Gizbar" to "Caspar" and "Kaspar" can thus be summarized as: Gizbar > Gasbar > Gaspar > Caspar > Kaspar (with "C" being a misreading of the manuscript "G" and "K" having the same phonetic value as "C". Another derivation proposed by Gutschmid (1864) could be the corruption of the Iranic name "Gondophares".

Place of origin

Who the magi were is not specified  in the Bible; there are only traditions. Since English translations of the Bible refer to them as "men who studied the stars", they are believed to have been astrologers, who could foresee the birth of a "Messiah" from their study of the stars.

Caspar is often considered to be an Indian scholar. An article in the 1913 Encyclopædia Britannica states that "according to Western church tradition, Balthasar is often represented as a king of Arabia, Melchior as a king of Persia, and Caspar as a king of India." Historian John of Hildesheim relates a tradition in the ancient silk road city of ancient Taxila that one of the Magi passed through the city on the way to Bethlehem.

Some consider Caspar to be King Gondophares (AD 21 – c. AD 47) mentioned in the Acts of Thomas. Others consider him to have come from the southern parts of India where, according to tradition, Thomas the Apostle visited decades later. The town by name Piravom in Kerala State, Southern India has for long claimed that one of the three Biblical Magi went from there. The name Piravom in the local Malayalam language translates to "birth". It is believed that the name originated from a reference to the Nativity of Jesus. There is a concentration of three churches named after the Biblical Magi in and around Piravom, as against only another three so named in the rest of India.

There are some who consider that Caspar's kingdom was located in the region of Egrisilla in India Superior on the peninsula that forms the eastern side of the Sinus Magnus (Gulf of Thailand) by Johannes Schöner on his globe of 1515. On it can be seen Egrisilla Bragmanni ("Egrisilla of the Brahmans"), and in the explanatory treatise which accompanied the globe, Schöner noted: “The region of Egrisilla, in which there are Brahman [i.e. Indian] Christians; there Gaspar the Magus held dominion”. The phrase hic rex caspar habitavit (here lived King Caspar) is inscribed over the Golden Chersonese (Malay Peninsula) on the mappemonde of Andreas Walsperger made in Constance around 1448. Whether it was a latter day king who took the name of Caspar is also not known.

The Magi are now considered by some not to have been kings. The reference to "kings" is believed to have originated due to the reference in Psalms "The kings of Tharsis and the islands shall offer presents; the kings of the Arabians and of Saba shall bring him gifts: and all the kings of the earth shall adore him" Psalm 72:10.

Some late medieval depictions of Caspar as an African king may have been influenced by accounts of the hajj pilgrimage of the Ghanan ruler Mansa Musa.

Gift to Child Jesus

Matthew wrote that the Magi brought three gifts - gold, frankincense and myrrh. These gifts apparently have deeper significance, the gold signifying the regal status of Jesus, the frankincense his divinity, and the myrrh his human nature. Caspar is traditionally portrayed with a reddish beard in the middle of the three kings, as younger than Melchior and older than Balthasar, and who waits in line behind Melchior to give the gift of frankincense to the Child Jesus. He is often portrayed in the act of accepting his gift from an assistant, or in the act of removing his crown, signs of preparing to be next at the feet of Child Jesus.

Death
According to tradition St Caspar became a martyr, and some consider that the other two Magi also met with the same fate. The relics of the Magi were found in Persia by St Helena, but were later brought to Constantinople and then to Milan in Italy. From there they reached Germany, where they are now housed in the Cologne Cathedral.
Caspar is commemorated on the Feast of Epiphany along with the other members of the Magi but is also commemorated in Catholicism with his feast day, 11 January. Following his return to his own country, avoiding King Herod, it is purported that Caspar celebrated Christmas with the other members of the Magi in Armenia in 54 AD. Caspar died on January 11, 55 AD at the age of 109.

Veneration
In some parishes, it is traditional to bless chalk for each family so that they may mark the first initial of each of the three Magi over their doors as a blessing for protection.

See also
Casper

References

External links

Biblical Magi
Christmas characters
Unnamed people of the Bible
Saints from the Holy Land